Dark Matter is a Canadian science fiction series created by Joseph Mallozzi and Paul Mullie, based on their comic book of the same name and developed by Prodigy Pictures in association with Space channel. An order for 13 episodes was placed for the first season of the series, which premiered on June 12, 2015.

On September 1, 2017, Syfy canceled the series after three seasons.

Series overview

Episodes

Season 1 (2015)

Season 2 (2016) 
The premiere episode of the season had 448,000 viewers in Canada.

Season 3 (2017)

References

External links
 

Dark Matter